The Metro State women's soccer team, or Roadrunners, represents Metropolitan State University of Denver in Denver, Colorado, United States

Postseason results

National Championships

Final Four history

References

NCAA Division II women's soccer teams